James Ferdinand Fairman (April 8, 1896 – April 25, 1967) was an American electrical engineer who received the IEEE Edison Medal in 1959 for "outstanding performance in improving the design of large electric power systems; for far-sighted leadership in atomic power development; and for unremitting efforts to improve the engineering profession".

References

External links
 Edison Medal

IEEE Edison Medal recipients
1896 births
1967 deaths